Diana W. Bianchi is an American medical geneticist and neonatologist noted for her research on fetal cell microchimerism and prenatal testing. She is the director of the Eunice Kennedy Shriver National Institute of Child Health and Human Development, part of the National Institutes of Health. Bianchi had previously been the Natalie V. Zucker Professor of Pediatrics, Obstetrics, and Gynecology at Tufts University School of Medicine and executive director of the Mother Infant Research Institute at Tufts Medical Center. She also has served as Vice Chair for Research in the Department of Pediatrics at the Floating Hospital for Children at Tufts Medical Center.

Early life and education
Bianchi grew up in New York City. She graduated from Hunter College High School.

Bianchi earned a B.A. magna cum laude from University of Pennsylvania and an M.D. from Stanford University School of Medicine. While at Stanford she performed her doctoral research with Leonard Herzenberg, Ph.D., studying the use of flow cytometry to develop a noninvasive cytogenetic prenatal diagnostic test for Down syndrome.  One of Herzenberg’s children had Down syndrome, so the project had both scientific and personal significance for her mentor.

Career
After medical school at Stanford University, she completed her postdoctoral work at Boston Children’s Hospital and Harvard Medical School. Bianchi joined the faculty at Harvard University in 1986, concurrently assuming a position as an attending neonatologist and geneticist at Boston Children’s Hospital. In 1993, Bianchi left to take a position at Tufts University School of Medicine, receiving an endowed chair in 2002.

In 2007, Bianchi became editor-in-chief of Prenatal Diagnosis, the journal of the International Society for Prenatal Diagnosis. In 2010, she founded the Mother Infant Research Institute at Tufts Medical Center, assuming the position of executive director. Bianchi is one of four authors of the book Fetology: Diagnosis and Management of the Fetal Patient,  which won the Association of American Publishers award for the best textbook in clinical medicine in 2000.

Bianchi has worked for many years on developing methods to isolate intact fetal cells from maternal blood as a noninvasive way to obtain fetal material for genetic diagnosis. While the work proved challenging due to the relative rarity of the fetal cells in the mother’s blood, the research led to an unexpected finding. Bianchi discovered that intact fetal cells remain in the mother's blood and organs for decades following pregnancy, with the possibility of migrating to the site of an injury in the mother, dividing and changing into the cells needed to fix the problem. This has led to a field of study known as fetal cell microchimerism.

Bianchi also has worked extensively on noninvasive prenatal testing using DNA sequencing of fetal and placental DNA fragments in the blood of pregnant women. Dr. Bianchi’s research is part of what has helped expand the use of non-invasive testing in the general obstetrical population. The sequencing technology employed in cfDNA testing has a number of potential uses in many areas of health care, Dr. Messerlian says, including cancer, transplantation and in vitro fertilization protocols, and research she is conducting is exploring those possibilities. This technology has been used in clinical prenatal care since 2011. In addition, Bianchi has pioneered the study of the amniotic fluid fetal transcriptome to develop new approaches to prenatal treatment of genetic conditions. She is a former member of the Clinical Advisory Board of Verinata Health, an Illumina company.

In 2014, Bianchi was the lead author on a study published in the New England Journal of Medicine that examined cell-free fetal DNA test performance in a general obstetrical population. This study showed that cell-free DNA testing had lower false positive rates and higher positive predictive values than maternal serum biochemistry analyses with or without ultrasound measurements of the back of the fetal neck. Bianchi has also studied the underlying biological reasons for false positive results following NIPT. She has shown that maternal malignancies can cause genome-wide imbalance that presents as a false positive result of fetal aneuploidy. Currently, Bianchi is working with a mouse model to develop a prenatal treatment that could be given to a pregnant woman carrying a fetus with Down syndrome. The goal of the work is to improve brain development in the womb and neurocognition after birth.

Bianchi was appointed director of the Eunice Kennedy Shriver National Institute of Child Health and Human Development, part of the U.S. National Institutes of Health, on August 25, 2016. In this role, she oversees research on pediatric health and development, maternal health, medical rehabilitation, population dynamics, reproductive health, and intellectual and developmental disabilities. In 2020, she received an honorary doctorate from the University of Amsterdam that recognized her contributions to the fields of fetal cell microchimerism and noninvasive prenatal testing using DNA sequencing of fetal and placental DNA fragments. In 2022, Bianchi was a finalist for a Samuel J. Heyman Service to America Medal, or Sammie, in recognition of her efforts in advancing critical research to understand the medical implications of COVID-19 among underserved populations. Later that year, Bianchi was named to Forbes Magazine's Top 50 Women Over 50: Impact.

Significant papers

Awards 
 1997   Milton O. and Natalie V. Zucker Prize for Outstanding Faculty Research, Tufts University School of Medicine
 2004   Kristine Sandberg Knisely Award, University of Pennsylvania School of Medicine
 2008   Foreign Corresponding Member, National Academy of Medicine, Argentina
 2010   Association of American Physicians
 2012   Duane Alexander Award from the Eunice Kennedy Shriver National Institute of Child Health and Human Development
 2012	National Advisory Council, Eunice Kennedy Shriver National Institute of Child Health and Human Development
 2012	Christopher Columbus Spirit of Discovery Award from Tufts University
 2013	Member, Institute of Medicine (now National Academy of Medicine), National Academies of Science
 2015   Landmark Award, American Academy of Pediatrics  
 2016   Maureen Andrew Mentor Award, Society for Pediatric Research
 2016   Honoree, Massachusetts Society for Medical Research
 2017   March of Dimes Colonel Harland Sanders Lifetime Achievement Award in Genetics 
2019   Pioneer Award, International Society for Prenatal Diagnosis 
2020   Health Public Service Visionary Award, Society for Women’s Health Research 
2022   Finalist, Samuel J. Heyman Service to America Medal

Leadership positions in professional societies 
 1999 - President, Perinatal Research Society
 2002-2005 - Council Member (Genetics), Society for Pediatric Research
 2002-2005 - Board of Directors, American Society of Human Genetics
 2007-2012 - Council Member, American Pediatric Society
 2006-2010 - President, International Society for Prenatal Diagnosis

Patents issued 
 U.S. Patent # 5, 641, 628, Non-invasive method for isolation and detection of fetal DNA, Date of application: 11/13/89, Date of patent: 6/24/97, Inventor: Diana W. Bianchi, Assignee: Children's Hospital, Boston MA
 U.S. Patent # 5, 648, 220, Methods for labeling intracytoplasmic molecules, Date of application: 2/14/95, Date of patent: 7/15/97, Inventors: Diana W. Bianchi, MaryAnn DeMaria, Assignee: New England Medical Center, Boston MA
 U.S. Patent # 5, 714, 325, Prenatal diagnosis by isolation of fetal granulocytes from maternal blood, Date of application: 9/24/93, Date of patent: 2/3/98, Inventor: Diana W. Bianchi, M.D., Assignee: New England Medical Center
 European Patent # 0500727, Non-invasive method for isolation and detection of fetal DNA, Date of application: 11/30/90, Date of patent: 1/21/98, Inventor:  Diana W. Bianchi, M.D., Assignee:  Children's Medical Center Corporation
 U.S. Patent # 5,830,679, Diagnostic Blood Test to identify Infants at Risk for Sepsis, Date of Patent 11/3/98, Inventors: Diana W. Bianchi, M.D., Nancy Weinschenk, M.D., Assignee: New England Medical Center
 European Patent # 99125132.3-2106, Method for Labeling Intracytoplasmic Molecules, Date of Patent 2/8/00, Inventors: Diana W. Bianchi and Mary Ann De Maria, Assignee: New England Medical Center Hospitals, Inc.

References

External links 
 http://www.nichd.nih.gov
 http://www.tuftsmedicalcenter.org/MIRI

Year of birth missing (living people)
Living people
American geneticists
Tufts University faculty
University of Pennsylvania alumni
Stanford University School of Medicine alumni
National Institutes of Health people
20th-century American biologists
21st-century American biologists
American women geneticists
American neonatologists
20th-century American women scientists
21st-century American women scientists
American women academics
Members of the National Academy of Medicine
American medical researchers
Women medical researchers